Justin Davidson (born in Rome, Italy, in 1966) is a classical music and architecture critic. 

In 1983, he graduated from the American Overseas School of Rome, where his mother was an English teacher. Davidson began his journalism career as a local stringer for the Associated Press in Rome, before moving to the United States to study music at Harvard University. He went on to earn a doctorate degree at Columbia University, where he also taught.

A composer as well as a music critic, Davidson became a staff writer for the Long Island newspaper Newsday in 1996, where he also wrote about architecture. In 2002, he won the Pulitzer Prize in criticism for "his crisp coverage of classical music that captures its essence." In September 2007, he was hired by New York Magazine.

Davidson was among the faculty of D-Crit.

He is married to Ariella Budick, a New York-based art critic for the Financial Times.

References

American music critics
American architecture critics
Writers from New York (state)
Pulitzer Prize for Criticism winners
1966 births
Living people
Harvard University alumni
Columbia University alumni
Opera critics
Classical music critics
Newsday people

20th-century American journalists
American male journalists